Willamette Leadership Academy is a public charter military academy in Lane County, Oregon, United States.

History and Academics
The Willamette Leadership Academy is a 501 c 3 non-profit organization. WLA is accredited through the NAAS and Oregon Dept of Education. All teachers are highly qualified and certified. All the PYCO Academies are recognized as TIER-ONE schools by the US Armed Forces.

PYCO opened in 1993 as an after school program. PYCO soon developed units in Medford, Cottage Grove, Eugene and Salem. In 1997 PYCO developed an alternative education program. In 2000 PYCO was one of the first 5-year charter schools to open. In 2003 PYCO moved from Eugene to Veneta under the Fern Ridge School District and opened Willamette Leadership Academy. 
In 2012, the charter was taken up by Springfield Public Schools and all grades moved to the former Goshen Elementary building in Eugene. 
In 2013, grades 6–8 split off and the newly created Battalion 2 moved into the old Mohawk Elementary building in Springfield.

Willamette Leadership Academy currently serves multiple counties with students attending from Drain to Lebanon and Walterville to Veneta. WLA employs approximately 50 staff members.

WLA High School is located at 34020 B Street, Eugene, OR 97405.

WLA Middle School is located at 91166 Sunderman Road, Springfield, OR 97478.

References

Education in Eugene, Oregon
High schools in Lane County, Oregon
Military high schools in the United States
Public high schools in Oregon
Public middle schools in Oregon
Charter schools in Oregon
1993 establishments in Oregon